A hiccup (scientific name singultus, from a Latin word meaning "to catch one's breath while sobbing"; also spelled hiccough) is an involuntary contraction (myoclonic jerk) of the diaphragm that may repeat several times per minute. The hiccup is an involuntary action involving a reflex arc. Once triggered, the reflex causes a strong contraction of the diaphragm followed about a quarter of a second later by closure of the vocal cords, which results in the "hic" sound.

Hiccups may occur individually, or they may occur in bouts. The rhythm of the hiccup, or the time between hiccups, tends to be relatively constant. A bout of hiccups generally resolves itself without intervention, although many home remedies are often used to attempt to shorten the duration. Medical treatment is occasionally necessary in cases of chronic hiccups.

Incidence
Hiccups affect people of all ages, even being observed in utero. They become less frequent with advancing age. Intractable hiccups, lasting more than a month, are more common in adults. While males and females are affected equally often, men are more likely to develop hiccups lasting more than 48 hours. Dogs may also get hiccups.

Signs and symptoms 

A hiccup consists of a single or a series of breathing diaphragm spasms, of variable spacing and duration, and a brief (less than one half second), unexpected, shoulder, abdomen, throat, or full body tremor. Hiccups may present as an audible chirp, squeak, "hupp", or if controlled, a quick inhaling gasp, sigh, or sniff. They may also present as brief but distracting or painful interruptions in normal breathing, with sudden momentary pain of the throat, chest, or abdomen.

Causes

Pathophysiological causes
 Swallowing air excessively
 Gastroesophageal reflux
 Hiatal hernia
 Rapid eating
 Carbonated beverages, alcohol, dry breads, and some spicy foods
 Opiate drug use
 Laughing vigorously or for a long time

Hiccups may be triggered by a number of common human conditions. In rare cases, they can be a sign of serious medical problems. In rare cases, hiccups can be the sole symptom of myocardial infarction.

Pre-phrenic nucleus irritation of medulla
 Kidney failure

CNS disorders
 Stroke
 Multiple sclerosis
 Meningitis

Nerve damage
 Damage to the vagus nerve after surgery

Other known associations
 Although no clear pathophysiological mechanism has been described, hiccups is known to have been the initial symptom of Plasmodium vivax malaria in at least one documented case.

Evolutionary theories

The burping reflex hypothesis 
A leading hypothesis is that hiccups evolved to facilitate greater milk consumption in young mammals. The coordination of breathing and swallowing during suckling is a complicated process. Some air inevitably enters the stomach, occupying space that could otherwise be optimally used for calorie rich milk.

The hypothesis suggests that the presence of an air bubble in the stomach stimulates the sensory (afferent) limb of the reflex through receptors in the stomach, esophagus and along the underside of the diaphragm. This triggers the active part of the hiccup (efferent limb), sharply contracting the muscles of breathing and relaxing the muscles of the esophagus, then closing the vocal cords to prevent air from entering the lungs. This creates suction in the chest, pulling air from the stomach up into the esophagus. As the respiratory muscles relax the air is expelled through the mouth, effectively "burping" the animal.

There are a number of characteristics of hiccups that support this theory. The burping of a suckling infant may increase its capacity for milk by more than 15-25%, bringing a significant survival advantage. There is a strong tendency for infants to get hiccups, and although the reflex persists throughout life it decreases in frequency with age. The location of the sensory nerves that trigger the reflex suggests it is a response to a condition in the stomach. The component of the reflex that suppresses peristalsis in the esophagus while the airway is being actively blocked suggests the esophagus is involved. Additionally, hiccups are only described in mammals - the group of animals that share the trait of suckling their young.

Phylogenetic hypothesis 
An international respiratory research group composed of members from Canada, France, and Japan proposed that the hiccup is an evolutionary remnant of earlier amphibian respiration. Amphibians such as tadpoles gulp air and water across their gills via a rather simple motor reflex akin to mammalian hiccuping. The motor pathways that enable hiccuping form early during fetal development, before the motor pathways that enable normal lung ventilation form. Thus, the hiccup is evolutionarily antecedent to modern lung respiration.

Additionally, this group (C. Straus et al.) points out that hiccups and amphibian gulping are inhibited by elevated CO2 and may be stopped by GABAB receptor agonists, illustrating a possible shared physiology and evolutionary heritage. These proposals may explain why premature infants spend 2.5% of their time hiccuping, possibly gulping like amphibians, as their lungs are not yet fully formed.

The phylogenetic hypothesis may explain hiccups as an evolutionary remnant, held over from our amphibious ancestors. This hypothesis has been questioned because of the complexity of the mammalian hiccup reflex compared to the amphibian breathing reflex, the fact that it does not explain the reason for glottic closure, and because the very short contraction of the hiccup is unlikely to have a significant strengthening effect on the slow-twitch muscles of respiration.

Fetal intrauterine hiccups are of two types. The physiological type occurs prior to twenty-eight weeks after conception and tends to last five to ten minutes. These hiccups are part of fetal development and are associated with the myelination of the phrenic nerve, which primarily controls the thoracic diaphragm.

The phylogenetic and the burping hypotheses are not mutually exclusive. The phylogeny hypothesis could explain how the hiccup reflex might have evolved, while the "Burping Hypothesis" could explain why it would offer enough of an evolutionary advantage to persist and increase in complexity.

Duration
Episodes of hiccups usually last under 30 minutes. Prolonged attacks, while rare, can be serious. Root causes of prolonged hiccups episodes are difficult to diagnose. Such attacks can cause significant morbidity and even death. An episode lasting more than a few minutes is termed a bout; a bout of over 48 hours is termed persistent or protracted. Hiccups lasting longer than a month are termed intractable. In many cases, only a single hemidiaphragm, usually the left one, is affected, although both may be involved.

Treatment
Hiccups are normally waited out, as any fit of them will usually pass quickly. Folk 'cures' for hiccups are common and varied. Hiccups are treated medically only in severe and persistent (termed "intractable") cases.

Numerous medical remedies exist but no particular treatment is known to be especially effective, generally because of a lack of high-quality evidence.  Many drugs have been used, such as baclofen, chlorpromazine, metoclopramide, gabapentin, and various proton-pump inhibitors. Hiccups that are secondary to some other cause, like gastroesophageal reflux disease or esophageal webs, are dealt with by treating the underlying disorder. The phrenic nerve can be blocked temporarily with injection of 0.5% procaine, or permanently with bilateral phrenicotomy or other forms of surgical destruction. Even this rather drastic treatment does not cure some cases, however.

Haloperidol, metoclopramide, and chlorpromazine are used in cases of intractable hiccups. Effective treatment with sedatives often requires a dose that renders the person either unconscious or highly lethargic. Hence, medicating with sedatives is only appropriate short-term, as the affected individual cannot continue with normal life activities while under their effect.

A vagus nerve stimulator has been used with an intractable case of hiccups. "It sends rhythmic bursts of electricity to the brain by way of the vagus nerve, which passes through the neck. The Food and Drug Administration approved the vagus nerve stimulator in 1997 as a way to control seizures in some patients with epilepsy."

Persistent digital rectal massage has also been proven effective in terminating intractable hiccups.

Folk remedies 
There are many superstitious and folk remedies for hiccups, including headstanding, drinking a glass of water upside-down, being frightened by someone, breathing into a bag, eating a large spoonful of peanut butter and placing sugar on or under the tongue. Infants rarely hiccup in feeding position, and one trick that works well is drinking water slowly in 45-degree laying position. It is also possible to mentally meditate and relax the muscles causing the hiccup and thus stop the hiccup.

Acupressure, either through actual function or placebo effect, may cure hiccups in some people. For example, one technique is to relax the chest and shoulders and find the deepest points of the indentations directly below the protrusions of the collarbones. The index or middle fingers are inserted into the indents and pressed firmly for sixty seconds as long, deep breaths are taken.

A simple treatment involves increasing the partial pressure of CO2 and inhibiting diaphragm activity by holding one's breath or rebreathing into a paper bag. Other potential remedies suggested by NHS Choices include pulling the knees up to the chest and leaning forward, sipping ice-cold water and swallowing some granulated sugar.

A breathing exercise called Supra-supramaximal inspiration (SSMI) have shown to also stop persistent hiccups.  It combine the three principles of  hypercapnia, diaphragm immobilization, and positive airway pressure.  First, exhale completely, then take a deep breath.  Hold the breath for 10 sec.  After 10 sec, take another small breath without exhaling.  Hold the breath for 5 sec.  Again, without exhaling, take another small breath and hold for 5 sec.  Exhale and your hiccup should be gone. 

Drinking through a straw with the ears plugged is a folk remedy that can be successful. In 2021 a scientific tool with a similar basis was tested on 249 hiccups subjects; the results were published in the Journal of the American Medical Association (JAMA). This device is named FISST (Forced Inspiratory Suction and Swallow Tool) and branded as "HiccAway". This study supports the use of FISST as an option to stop transient hiccups, with more than 90% of participants reporting better results than home remedies. HiccAway stops hiccups by forceful suction that is being generated by diaphragm contraction (phrenic nerve activity), followed by swallowing the water, which requires epiglottis closure.

Society and culture
The word hiccup itself was created through imitation. The alternative spelling of hiccough results from the association with the word cough.

American Charles Osborne (14 December 1892 – 1 May 1991) had hiccups for 68 years, from 1922 to February 1990, and was entered in the Guinness World Records as the man with the longest attack of hiccups, an estimated 430 million hiccups.
In 2007, Florida teenager Jennifer Mee gained media fame for hiccuping around 50 times per minute for more than five weeks.
British singer Christopher Sands hiccupped an estimated 10 million times in a 27-month period from February 2007 to May 2009.  His condition, which meant that he could hardly eat or sleep, was eventually discovered to be caused by a tumor on his brain stem pushing on nerves causing him to hiccup every two seconds, 12 hours a day.  His hiccups stopped in 2009 following surgery.

In Baltic, German, Hungarian, Indian, Romanian, Slavic, Turkish, Greek, Albanian and among some tribes in Kenya, for example in the folklore of the Luo people, it is said that hiccups occur when the person experiencing them is being talked about by someone not present.

See also
 Getting the wind knocked out of you
 Mr. Hiccup
 Sneeze
 Cough
 Thumps, a more serious form of hiccups found in equines
 Choking
 Yawn
 Vocal hiccup

References

Further reading

 Provine, Robert R. Curious Behavior: Yawning, Laughing, Hiccupping, and Beyond (Harvard University Press; 2012) 246 pages; examines the evolutionary context for humans
  – hiccup related to reflex in fish and amphibians.

External links 

 BBC News: Why we hiccup
 WIRED: The Best Cure for Hiccups: Remind Your Brain You're Not a Fish
 
 WebMD: Hiccups

Symptoms and signs: Respiratory system
Reflexes